The false bluetail emo skink (Emoia pseudocyanura) is a species of lizard in the family Scincidae. It is found in Bougainville and the Solomon Islands.

References

Emoia
Reptiles described in 1991
Reptiles of Papua New Guinea
Taxa named by Walter Creighton Brown
Reptiles of the Solomon Islands